The Immediate Geographic Region of São Lourenço is one of the 10 immediate geographic regions in the Intermediate Geographic Region of Pouso Alegre, one of the 70 immediate geographic regions in the Brazilian state of Minas Gerais and one of the 509 of Brazil, created by the National Institute of Geography and Statistics (IBGE) in 2017.

Municipalities 
It comprises 16 municipalities.

 Alagoa   
 Carmo de Minas    
 Conceição do Rio Verde    
 Cristina    
 Dom Viçoso     
 Itamonte     
 Itanhandu    
 Jesuânia     
 Lambari     
 Olímpio Noronha     
 Passa Quatro    
 Pouso Alto   
 São Lourenço   
 São Sebastião do Rio Verde   
 Soledade de Minas   
 Virgínia

See also 

 List of Intermediate and Immediate Geographic Regions of Minas Gerais

References 

Geography of Minas Gerais